Bavirecta is a genus of Asian jumping spiders first described by N. Kanesharatnam & Suresh P. Benjamin in 2018.  it contains only two species. It was placed in the tribe Baviini, part of the clade Salticoida of the subfamily Salticinae.

Species
, the World Spider Catalog recognizes two species:
Bavirecta exilis (Cao & Li, 2016) — China
Bavirecta flavopuncta Kanesharatnam & Benjamin, 2018 — Sri Lanka

References

External links

Salticidae genera
Salticidae